The 1991 Green Bay Packers season was their 73rd season overall and their 71st in the National Football League. The team finished with a 4–12 record under coach Lindy Infante, earning them fourth-place finish in the NFC Central division and costing Infante his job.

Offseason

NFL Draft

Personnel

Staff

Roster

Regular season

Schedule

Game summaries

Week 3

Standings

References

External links
 1991 Green Bay Packers at Pro-Football-Reference.com

Green Bay Packers seasons
Green Bay Packers
Green Bay Packers